Rozhdestvensky is a rural locality (a village) in Kirillovsky Selsoviet, Ufimsky District, Bashkortostan, Russia. The population was 95 as of 2010. There are 3 streets.

Geography 
Rozhdestvensky is located 31 km northeast of Ufa (the district's administrative centre) by road. Kirillovo is the nearest rural locality.

References 

Rural localities in Ufimsky District